Mark Ethridge (born  May 28, 1949) is a novelist, screenwriter, and communications consultant.  His novel Grievances was released in 2006, and adapted into the 2012 film Deadline.

Early life
A native of Winston-Salem, North Carolina, he attended Phillips Exeter Academy and graduated cum laude from Princeton University in 1971 with a degree in history. In 1985–86 he was a Nieman Fellow at Harvard University.

Writing career
Ethridge began as a reporter for the Associated Press, worked as a reporter and editor at The Charlotte Observer and was managing editor from 1979 to 1988. He played a key role in the newsroom’s two Pulitzer Prizes for Public Service – for an investigation of brown lung disease and for the PTL scandal.

From 1989 to 1998, Ethridge was president and publisher of The Business Journal of Charlotte. He supervised a number of other business journals across the country and several publications devoted to NASCAR racing for Newhouse/Advance.

In 1998, Ethridge became president and part-owner of The Cotter Group, a NASCAR-based sports public relations and marketing agency based in Harrisburg, North Carolina, which became a part of Clear Channel Communications in 2000.

He was president of Carolina Parenting, Inc. which publishes Charlotte Parent magazine and the parenting magazines in Greensboro/Winston-Salem/High Point and Raleigh/Durham/Chapel Hill from 1990-2014.

His first novel, Grievances, was published in May 2006 by NewSouth Books. Deadline, a movie version for which he wrote the screenplay, premiered in 2012.

His second novel, Fallout, was published in February 2012 by NewSouth Books.

Personal life
Ethridge has been married since c. 1972. He has two grown children.

Published works
"Grievances" (2006)
"Fallout" (2012)

Film adaptations
Deadline (2012)

References

 
 
 

1949 births
Living people
Writers from North Carolina
American male writers